The 2020 Kansallinen Liiga was the 14th season of the Naisten Liiga, the top flight women's division of the Finnish football league system and the 1st season of the Kansallinen Liiga after its change of name.
Åland United were the champions after 18 rounds of matches.

Teams
The season featured 10 teams.PK-35 Vantaa were promoted from the 2019 Naisten Ykkönen as league winners while PK-35 (women) were promoted after defeating IK Myran at the 2019 playoff. IK Myran and ONS were relegated from the previous season.

Source: Suomen Palloliitto (Finnish Football Association)

Format
The 10 teams played each other twice. At the end of the season, the ninth placed team played the Ykkönen second placed team in a Promotion/relegation play-off. The winner of the league also earns the right to play in the 2021–22 UEFA Women's Champions League.

Regular season

Results

Promotion/relegation play-offs
The ninth placed team, JyPK engaged the Ykkönen runners-up, VIFK in a two-legged play-off to decide if they will remain in the league.

First leg

Second leg

JyPK won 7–1 on aggregate and remained in the league.

Top scorers

References

External links 
2020 season at Kansallinenliiga Liiga 
Soccerway at Soccerway.com

Kansallinen Liiga seasons
Finland